The Sangkae River (Stung Sangkae; also spelled Stung Sangké or Stung Sangkhae) is one of the main rivers in Battambang Province in north western Cambodia. It flows through 6 districts and 27 communes in Battambang province before draining into the Tonlé Sap lake. The average depth of the river, based on raw data provided by the Battambang's Department of Water Resource (2013) is during the dry season  and during the wet season .

References

Rivers of Cambodia
Geography of Battambang province
Tonlé Sap